Left of Center is the follow-up album of Javier Colon following his debut album Javier. The album is credited to Javier rather than the full name Javier Colon.

Track listing
You're the One (4:06)
Indecent Proposal (4:05)
Wassup (3:49)
Dance For Me (3:36)
The Answer Is Yes (3:22)
Is This Love (3:36)
Poetry	Javier (3:58)
Count On Me  (4:11)
Once We Start (4:22)
Can I Talk to You (3:57)
Ways I'm Feeling U (4:10)
Lovin' U (5:24)
Dance For Me – The Reggaeton Remix  (3:34)

Chart

External links
[ Billboard: Javier – Left of Center]

2006 albums
Javier Colon albums